The 2004–05 Kansas Jayhawks men's basketball team represented the University of Kansas Jayhawks for the NCAA Division I men's 2004–05 NCAA Division I men's basketball season. The team was led by Bill Self in his second season as head coach. The team played its home games at Allen Fieldhouse in Lawrence, Kansas. The Jayhawks finished the season with a record of 23–7, 12–4 in Big 12 play to finish in a tie for first place in conference. The season marked the first of an NCAA record-setting 14 consecutive conference championships for Kansas. They lost to Oklahoma State in the semifinals of the Big 12 tournament. They received an at-large bid to the NCAA tournament as a No. 3 seed in the Syracuse Region. The Jayhawks were upset in the First Round by Bucknell on a last second shot.

Recruiting class

Transfers 

|-
|}

Roster

Schedule

|-
!colspan=9 style=| Summer Canadian exhibition

|-
!colspan=9 style=| Exhibition

|-
!colspan=9 style=| Regular season

|-
!colspan=9 style=|Big 12 Tournament

|-
!colspan=9 style=|NCAA tournament

Awards
2004–05 Phillips 66 Big 12 Player of the Year
Wayne Simien (Senior, Forward)
Bayer Advantage® Senior CLASS Award
Wayne Simien (Senior, Forward)
All-Big 12 Second Team
Keith Langford (Senior, Guard)
All-Big 12 Third Team
Aaron Miles (Senior, Guard)
Phillips 66 Big 12 Player of the Week
Wayne Simien (Senior, Forward), November 22 and January 17
Keith Langford (Senior, Guard), January 3 (co-winner)
CBS Player of the Game vs Kentucky
Christian Moody (Junior, Forward), January 9
Academic All-Big 12
Michael Lee (Senior, Guard)
Christian Moody (Junior, Forward)

References

Kansas Jayhawks men's basketball seasons
Kansas
Jay
Jay
Kansas